Achroia innotata is a species of snout moth, known from Sarawak, Malaysia, Sri Lanka and South Africa. It was described by Francis Walker in 1864.

The larvae infest beehives, including those of Apis cerana.

Subspecies
Achroia innotata innotata 
Achroia innotata lankella
Achroia innotata sakaiella

References

Galleriini
Moths described in 1864
Snout moths of Africa
Moths of Asia